The 1944 Sugar Bowl was a college football bowl game played on January 1, 1944, at Tulane Stadium in New Orleans, Louisiana.  It was the tenth playing of the Sugar Bowl.  The Tulsa Golden Hurricane returned to the game for the second consecutive season and faced the Georgia Tech Yellow Jackets, who became the first team to have played in all four major bowls; they had previously participated in the 1929 Rose Bowl, the 1940 Orange Bowl, and the 1943 Cotton Bowl Classic. The Golden Hurricane had an 18–7 lead at halftime, but Georgia Tech roared back, scoring 13 unanswered points to win.

Scoring summary

First quarter
 Tulsa: Ed Shedlosky 15-yard pass from Clyde LeForce (kick failed); 6–0 Tulsa

Second quarter
 Tulsa: Jimmy Ford 76-yard run (kick failed); 12–0 Tulsa
 GT: Frank Broyles 1-yard run (Eddie Prokop kick); 12–7 Tulsa
 Tulsa: LeForce 1-yard run (kick failed); 18–7 Tulsa

Third quarter
 GT: Phil Tinsley 46-yard pass from Prokop (kick failed); 18–13 Tulsa

Fourth quarter
 GT: Ed Scharfscherdt 1-yard run (Prokop kick); 20–18 Georgia Tech

References

Sugar Bowl
Sugar Bowl
Georgia Tech Yellow Jackets football bowl games
Tulsa Golden Hurricane football bowl games
Sugar Bowl
Sugar Bowl